Natalia Aispurua (born ) is an Argentine female volleyball player. She is part of the Argentina women's national volleyball team.

She participated in the 2014 FIVB Volleyball World Grand Prix, and 2015 FIVB Volleyball World Grand Prix.
At club level she played for Boca Juniors in 2014.

Awards

Individuals
 2017 Pan-American Cup "2nd Best Middle Blocker"

References

External links
 Profile at FIVB.org

1991 births
Living people
Argentine women's volleyball players
Place of birth missing (living people)
Pan American Games competitors for Argentina
Volleyball players at the 2015 Pan American Games
Middle blockers
21st-century Argentine women